Is the 2012–13 UD Almería season.  The club plays in two tournaments: the Segunda División and the Copa del Rey. It is the second season since the club had been relegated from La Liga.

On 22 June, Almería is promoted to La Liga, after defeating Girona in the play-offs. Charles finished the season as the club and division topscorer.

Players

Squad
Retrieved on 11 August 2012

Youth team players

Transfers

In

|}
Total spending:  €0

Out

|}
Total gaining:  €1,800,000

Player statistics

Squad Stats 

 

|-
|colspan="12"|Players who have left the club after the start of the season:

|}

Top scorers

Disciplinary record

Competition

Segunda División

Results summary

Results by round

Competitive

Pre-season

Segunda División

Promotion play-offs

Semifinals

Finals

First leg

Second leg

Copa del Rey

References

External links

Almeria
UD Almería seasons